The Edmonton Rush are a lacrosse team based in Edmonton playing in the National Lacrosse League (NLL). The 2011 season was the 6th in franchise history. The Rush finished 5-11, tied with the Colorado Mammoth, but ended up in 5th place due to tiebreakers and finished out of the playoffs for the fifth time in their six seasons.

Regular season

Conference standings

Game log
Reference:

Transactions

Trades

*Later traded back to the Edmonton Rush
**Later traded to the Minnesota Swarm

Entry Draft
The 2010 NLL Entry Draft took place on September 8, 2010. The Rush selected the following players:

Roster

See also
2011 NLL season

References

Edmonton Rush seasons
2011 in lacrosse